Denis Reagan Hurley (born 1937) is a senior United States district judge of the United States District Court for the Eastern District of New York.

Education and career

Born in Baldwin, New York, Hurley received a Bachelor of Science degree from the University of Pennsylvania, Wharton School of Business in 1959, a Master of Business Administration from Columbia University in 1962, and a Juris Doctor from Fordham University School of Law in 1966. He was a court bailiff for Judge John M. Cannella, of the United States District Court for the Southern District of New York from 1963 to 1966. He was in private practice in Syracuse, New York from 1966 to 1968, and was a principal assistant district attorney of Suffolk County, New York from 1968 to 1970, returning to private practice in Riverhead, New York from 1970 to 1983. He was a special prosecutor for Suffolk County from 1974 to 1975 and served in the Suffolk County Legislature from 1978 to 1979. He was a senior assistant county attorney of Suffolk County from 1980 to 1981. He was a judge of the New York State Family Court from 1983 to 1987, and of the New York State County Court for Suffolk County from 1988 to 1991, also serving as an acting justice of the New York State Supreme Court from 1987 to 1988.

Federal judicial service

On June 27, 1991, Hurley was nominated by President George H. W. Bush to a new seat on the United States District Court for the Eastern District of New York created by 104 Stat. 5089. He was confirmed by the United States Senate on October 31, 1991, and received commission on November 5, 1991. He assumed senior status on December 18, 2004.

References

Sources
 

1937 births
Living people
Columbia Business School alumni
Fordham University School of Law alumni
Judges of the United States District Court for the Eastern District of New York
United States district court judges appointed by George H. W. Bush
20th-century American judges
Wharton School of the University of Pennsylvania alumni
New York (state) state court judges
County legislators in New York (state)
21st-century American judges